Darko Ruso (born 28 March 1962) is a Serbian professional basketball coach who is the current head coach for BC Avtodor of the VTB United League and the Kazakhstan Championship.

Coaching career 
In June 2021, Astana hired Ruso as their new head coach. He left Astana in March 2022.

See also 
 List of KK Partizan head coaches

References

External links
 
 
 Profile at eurobasket.com

1962 births
Living people
Apollon Patras B.C. coaches
BC Astana coaches
BC Vienna coaches
Iraklis Thessaloniki B.C. coaches
KK Beobanka coaches
KK Budućnost coaches
KK Hemofarm coaches
KK Partizan coaches
Maroussi B.C. coaches
BC Avtodor coaches
Serbian men's basketball coaches
Serbian expatriate basketball people in Austria
Serbian expatriate basketball people in Montenegro
Serbian expatriate basketball people in Bosnia and Herzegovina
Serbian expatriate basketball people in Greece
Serbian expatriate basketball people in Italy
Serbian expatriate basketball people in Ukraine
Serbian expatriate basketball people in Kazakhstan